Tiiu Märss (until 1970 Tiiu Noppel; born 5 October 1943, in Elva) is an Estonian geologist and paleontologist.

She has described the following taxon:
 Andreolepididae Märss, 2001

References

1943 births
Living people
Estonian paleontologists
Estonian geologists
University of Tartu alumni
Academic staff of the University of Tartu
Academic staff of the Tallinn University of Technology
People from Elva, Estonia